Achilles Veen is a football club from Veen, Netherlands. Achilles Veen plays in the 2017–18 Saturday Hoofdklasse A.

History 
On 27 October 2021, Achilles Veen defeated GVV Unitas 4–0 to advance to the second round of the 2021–22 KNVB Cup. It was the only Hoofdklasse side to advance to the second round in that season's competition.

References

External links
 Official site

Football clubs in the Netherlands
Football clubs in Altena, North Brabant
Association football clubs established in 1944
1944 establishments in the Netherlands